is a Japanese basketball coach who is head coach of the Tokyo Excellence in the Japanese B.League.　He played college basketball for Keio University. He was selected by the Chiba Jets with the 4th overall pick in the 2011 bj League draft.

Head coaching record

|-
| style="text-align:left;"|Tokyo Excellence
| style="text-align:left;"|2017-18
| 42||28||14|||| style="text-align:center;"|3rd in B3|||20||12||8||
| style="text-align:center;"|3rd in Final stage
|-

References

1982 births
Living people
Alvark Tokyo players
Chiba Jets Funabashi players
Japanese basketball coaches
Tokyo Excellence coaches
Yokohama Excellence players